The World Is Yours is the debut studio album by American rapper Rich the Kid. It was released on March 30, 2018, by Interscope Records and Rich Forever Music. The album features guest appearances from Rich Forever Music labelmate Jay Critch, alongside Chris Brown, Kendrick Lamar, Lil Wayne, Khalid, Rick Ross, Swae Lee of Rae Sremmurd, Trippie Redd, and Quavo and Offset of Migos, among others.

The World Is Yours was supported by three singles: "New Freezer" featuring Kendrick Lamar, "Plug Walk" and "Dead Friends". The album received generally favorable reviews and was platinum by the RIAA on March 9, 2020.

Background
On February 5, 2018, in an interview with XXL, Rich the Kid remarked on the album's expectation, by stating;

On February 9, 2018, in an interview with Zane Lowe on Beats 1, Rich the Kid mentioned Kendrick Lamar, Khalid, Lil Wayne, Jay Critch, Famous Dex as guest features on the album. The album's official release date was revealed on February 21, 2018.

On February 23, 2018, shortly after his appearance at the 2018 Brit Awards with Kendrick Lamar, Rich the Kid revealed his debut album's title. On February 28, 2018, the album's cover art was unveiled via Twitter.

Artwork
The album's artwork features Rich the Kid donning a white suit and a silk button-up, and a slew of chains while holding stacks of cash in hand. He stands in an unknown location surrounded by a forest environment.

The title of the album comes from the film Scarface in Tony Montana's mansion. Along with the name, other elements of the album cover reflect other parts of the film.

Singles
The album's lead single, "New Freezer" featuring Kendrick Lamar was released for streaming and digital download on September 26, 2017, shortly after premiering on Zane Lowe's Beats 1 radio. The Dave Free and Jack Begert-directed music video was released on October 30, 2017.

The album's second single, "Plug Walk" was released on February 9, 2018, following the same roll-out as the former. The Daps-directed music video was released on March 5, 2018.

The album's third single "Dead Friends" was released on March 26, 2018, following the continuous roll-out. The music video was released on April 23, 2018, and it was directed by Rich the Kid himself.

Promotional singles
The album's lead promotional single, "Early Morning Trappin" featuring Trippie Redd was released on March 15, 2018.

Controversy
On February 27, 2018, Rich the Kid went on Instagram Live to preview a new track called "Dead Friends", which fans and commentators labeled a diss song aimed at Lil Uzi Vert.

Critical reception

Scott Glaysher in a review for HipHopDX gave the album a 3.6/5 and said "The World Is Yours won't have Rich leading the league but it does show his potential and willingness to grow as an artist the new generation of viral hit-driven rappers. If Rich can continue to craft hot singles and wean himself away from leaning on big-name talent, he may actually find rap's globe nestled in his pocket."

Commercial performance
The World Is Yours debuted at number two on the US Billboard 200 with 59,000 album-equivalent units, of which 6,000 were pure album sales. In its second week, the album dropped to number eight on the Billboard 200 and moved another 36,499 album-equivalent units.  By December 2018, the album has earned 620,000 album-equivalent units in the United States. On March 9, 2020, the album was certified platinum by Recording Industry Association of America (RIAA) for combined sales and album-equivalent units of over a million units.

Track listing
Credits adapted from the album's liner notes, Tidal, ASCAP, XXL, and Instagram.

Notes
  signifies an additional producer.
  signifies an uncredited co-producer.
 "World Is Yours" features uncredited background vocals from Cassius Clay.
 "Leave Me" doesn't appear on the physical version.

Personnel
Credits adapted from the album's liner notes and Tidal.

Technical

 Michael "MikFly" Dottin – mixing , recording 
 Chris Guevara – recording 
 Jeff Ramirez – recording 
 Zeke Mishanec – recording 
 Eric Manco – recording 
 Marlon "Mooch" Adams – recording 
 Eddie "eMIX" Hernandez – recording 
 Patrizio Pigliapoco – recording 
 Gavin Finn – recording 
 Dex Randall – recording 
 Jeff Edwards – recording 
 Randy Lanphear – recording 
 Jaycen Joshua – mixing 

Miscellaneous

 Alex Loucas – photography, art direction
 Travis Brothers – design

Charts

Weekly charts

Year-end charts

Certifications

References

Rich the Kid albums
2018 debut albums
Albums produced by DJ Mustard
Albums produced by Harry Fraud
Albums produced by Metro Boomin
Albums produced by Mike Free
Albums produced by T-Minus (record producer)
Albums produced by WondaGurl
Interscope Records albums